Benson is the primary village and a census-designated place (CDP) in the town of Benson, Rutland County, Vermont, United States. As of the 2020 census, it had a population of 269, out of 974 in the entire town.

The CDP is in northwestern Rutland County, at the geographic center of the town. Vermont Route 22A runs along the eastern edge of the village, leading north  to Orwell and south  to Fair Haven. Vermont Route 144 has its western terminus at Benson and leads northeast  to Hortonia.

References 

Populated places in Rutland County, Vermont
Census-designated places in Rutland County, Vermont
Census-designated places in Vermont